Lefever is a surname. Notable people with the surname include:

Ernest W. Lefever (born 1919), American political theorist
Daniel Myron LeFever (born 1835), American gun maker
Jacob LeFever (born 1830), American Congressman from New York
Joseph Lefever (born 1760), member of the United States House of Representatives
Minard Lefever (born 1798), American architect